The Governor, in the Kingdom of Mosquitia, was a Hereditary official who ruled the southern regions, from the Cucalaya River to Pearl Lagoon.

List of governors
Piquirin (−1711-)
John Hanibal (1719–1729)
John Briton (1729–1757)
William Briton (1757–1775)
Timothy Briton (c 1775-c 1776)
Colvin Briton (1776–1791)
Robin Lee (c. 1791 – ?)
Clement (c. 1791–1840)

References

Miskito